Rudolph Doodnauth (born 7 June 1947) is a Guyanese cricketer. He played in five first-class matches for Guyana from 1972 to 1988.

See also
 List of Guyanese representative cricketers

References

External links
 

1947 births
Living people
Guyanese cricketers
Guyana cricketers